The 2009 Swiss Olympic curling trials were held October 12-14 in Arlesheim. The winning team represented Switzerland at the 2010 Winter Olympics.

Only a men's event was held. Mirjam Ott's women's team was the only team that entered for the women's event.

Teams
Only two teams entered.

Results
The event was a best of seven tournament.

Stöckli won best of 7, 4 games to 1.

References
 

Olympic Curling Trials
Swiss Olympic Curling Trials, 2009
Qualification for the 2010 Winter Olympics
Curling at the 2010 Winter Olympics
Curling competitions in Switzerland
2009 in Swiss sport
Switzerland at the Winter Olympics